The Zigana Tunnel is a road tunnel constructed on the Maçka, Trabzon–Torul, Gümüşhane state highway   southwest of the provincial border Trabzon–Gümüşhane, northeastern Turkey. It was opened to traffic in 1988.

Situated at Zigana Pass on the Pontic Mountains, the -long tunnel was excavated in two years. The breakthrough took place on 2 September 1977. It carries one lane of traffic in each direction in one tube, which has  clearance and  width.

New Zigana Tunnel project
In September 2013, it was announced that a new tunnel is projected at Zigana Pass. It will be a -long twin-tube tunnel carrying two lanes of traffic in each direction between Güzelyayla, Maçka and Köstere, Torul at  elevation.

References

External links
Video animation of the existing and the projected tunnels

Road tunnels in Turkey
Transport in Gümüşhane Province